Kauffman Mill, also known as Spengler Mill, is a historic grist mill located in Upper Bern Township, Berks County, Pennsylvania.  The combined mill and house building was built about 1780, and is a 1 1/2-story, with basement, stone and half-timbered frame building. It measures 28 feet, 6 inches, by 38 feet.  The mill ceased operation in about 1939. The custom mill was built to serve local farms.

It was listed on the National Register of Historic Places in 1990.

Gallery

References

Grinding mills in Berks County, Pennsylvania
Grinding mills on the National Register of Historic Places in Pennsylvania
Industrial buildings completed in 1780
National Register of Historic Places in Berks County, Pennsylvania